Khan Sahib is a town sub-district and  a notified area committee in Budgam district in the central Kashmir, union territory of Jammu and Kashmir, India. v

Demographics

Khan Sahib had a population of 2,038  India census. Males constitute 50% of the population and females 50%. Khan Sahib has an average literacy rate of 89%, : male literacy is 87, and female literacy is 62%. In Khan Sahib, 12% of the population is under 6 years of age

Municipal committee
Municipal Committee Khansahib is a local body which administrates the town of Khansahib in Budgam district, Jammu and Kashmir, India. It has 7 elected members. Its last elections took place on 8 October 2018.

Keys:

References

Cities and towns in Budgam district